The Ambasamudram taluk is in the Tirunelveli district of the Indian state of Tamil Nadu. The headquarters is the town of Ambasamudram.

Demographics
According to the 2011 census, the taluk of Ambasamudram had a population of 427,557 with 209,974 males and 217,583 females. There were 1036 women for every 1000 men. The taluk had a literacy rate of 77.53. Child population in the age group below 6 was 20,705 males and 19,945 females.

See also
Rengasamudram

References 

Taluks of Thirunelveli district